Kalyan Singh Kalvi Indian state of Rajasthan.

Kalvi came from the village of Kalvi in Nagaur district, Rajasthan. He was Agriculture Minister in the Government of Rajasthan during the period when Bhairon Singh Shekhawat was Chief Minister. Later, he was elected to the Ninth Lok Sabha in the general election of 1989 from Barmer Lok Sabha constituency. Kalvi was close confidant of Chandra Shekhar and played a key role in formation of Shekhar's government after the fall of the V.P. Singh government. He became a cabinet minister in 1991, holding the portfolio for Energy. He died soon after.
Kalvi was a leader of the Janata Dal political party and also prominent and popular in the rural areas of Rajasthan as well as in the Rajput community.

His son, Lokendra Singh Kalvi, is a leader of the Rajput organisation Karni Sena, and has been associated with multiple political parties, including the Indian National Congress, and the Bahujan Samaj Party. His grandson, Bhavani Kalvi, is a polo player who has represented India in the sport; another grandson, Pratap Kalvi, is a reputed marksman.
and he is one best leadership to connect the rajput samaj

References 

India MPs 1989–1991
People from Nagaur district
Lok Sabha members from Rajasthan
Members of Parliament from Barmer
1991 deaths
Janata Dal politicians
1933 births
Ministers of Power of India
Samajwadi Janata Party politicians
Swatantra Party politicians
Rajasthan MLAs 1977–1980
Rajasthan MLAs 1980–1985